Songs is a 2005 compilation album by country singer Willie Nelson.

Track listing 
Crazy [Original Demo] - 3:58
Touch Me - 2:13
Good Times - 2:27
Yesterday's Wine - 3:13
Whiskey River - 4:04
Stay All Night (Stay a Little Longer) - 2:34
It's Not Supposed to Be That Way - 3:30
Blue Eyes Crying in the Rain - 2:21
Good Hearted Woman [Live] - 2:57
Always on My Mind - 3:32
Just to Satisfy You - 2:50
Pancho and Lefty [feat. Merle Haggard] - 4:48
She Is Gone - 2:58
My Own Peculiar Way - 3:38
Funny How Time Slips Away [feat. Francine Reed] - 4:11
Night Life [feat. B.B. King] - 4:28
Rainbow Connection - 4:30
Don't Fade Away [feat. Brian McKnight] - 4:20
Mendocino County Line [feat. Lee Ann Womack] - 4:31
On the Road Again [Live] - 2:31

Charts

Weekly charts

Year-end charts

References

2005 compilation albums
Willie Nelson compilation albums
Lost Highway Records compilation albums